The Symphony No. 2 in E-flat major, Op. 35, is a four-movement orchestral composition by the Finnish composer Leevi Madetoja, who wrote the piece from 1916–18 immediately following the success of his First Symphony (1916). Composed during the Finnish Civil War, the Second stands as "the most significant musical document" of the conflict and finds its composer, "deeply scarred by the experience", reflecting upon national tragedy and personal loss (his brother, Yrjö, and close friend, Toivo Kuula, both perished during the hostilities). Accordingly, Madetoja's Second is the longest and most dramatic of his three essays in the form and, perhaps for this reason, is the most popular of the set.

Robert Kajanus and the Helsinki Philharmonic Orchestra premiered the work in Helsinki, Finland on 17 December 1918. The critics received the premiere enthusiastically and, thus, the new piece firmly established Madetoja as the vanguard of Finnish music. In 1934, Madetoja (retroactively) dedicated the symphony to his late mother.

History 
As the year 1918 arrived, the embers of the First World War ignited into civil war (27 January – 15 May 1918) between Tsarist Russia and the Grand Duchy of Finland, which sought independence. Madetoja was still at work on his new symphony—a composition in which he had decided to contemplate Finland's fate in the wake of world war and a revolution in Russia—when the Finnish Civil War brought personal tragedy. On 9 April, Red Guards captured Yrjö Madetoja, Leevi's only surviving sibling, in Viipuri, where he was executed along with other officials. It fell to Leevi to break the news to the family:

A month later during May Day celebrations, Kuula got into an altercation with a group of White Army officers and, in the heat of the moment, was shot to death, dying on 18 May. These two losses deeply upset Madetoja and likely found expression in the symphony; the epilogue Madetoja affixed to the work is one of pain and resignation, "I have fought my battle and now withdraw".

The 17 December 1918 premiere of the Second Symphony under Kajanus's baton was extraordinarily well received. Writing in Uusi Suometar, Katila, for example, proclaimed Madetoja's latest work to be "The most remarkable achievement in our music since the monumental series of Sibelius", and certainly the Second Symphony remains Madetoja's most popular. (At the time, Sibelius had written five symphonies, although the Fifth Symphony had not yet reached its definitive form, which arrived in 1919.) The 17 December 1918 premiere of Madetoja's Second Symphony similarly impressed Sibelius, who was again in attendance. (Upon his mother's death in 1934, Madetoja retroactively dedicated the Second Symphony to her.) At this time, Madetoja also composed a piece for solo piano in memory of his brother, originally titled Improvisation in Memory of my Brother Yrjö and published in Lumikukkia magazine in 1918. In 1919, Madetoja expanded the piece into a three-movement suite, The Garden of Death, Op. 41. The suite, which shares melodic motifs with the Second Symphony, does not mention Yrjö by name.

Structure 
The symphony is in four-movements, with I and II linked and III and IV linked:

Discography 

In his review of the Sakari and Volmer efforts, the American Record Guide's Tom Godell singles out the Second as the composer's "greatest symphony", describing the first movement as "richly melodic", the second movement as a "barbaric Andante" modeled on the second movement of Sibelius's First Symphony, and—in a less positive note—the third movement as a "monotonous scherzo ... [that] fails to hold the listener's interest. The battle scene from Ein Heldenleben this ain't". As for the performers, Godell gives the advantage to Volmer and the Oulu Symphony Orchestra, the "gorgeous playing" of which "transform[s] this little-known work into a deeply affecting musical experience"; Sakari and the Iceland Symphony Orchestra, on the other hand, at times make Madetoja's "exciting" symphony feel "dull and repetitious".

Notes, references, and sources

Notes

References

Sources 

Books

CD liner notes

Journal articles
 

Symphonies by Leevi Madetoja
20th-century classical music
1918 compositions
Compositions in E-flat major